Saint Xenia is the name of:

 Great-martyr Xenia of Peloponnesus, Wonderworker (318), May 3, Greek Saint
 Irene of Hungary, took the religious name Xenia, wife of Emperor John II Comnenus (1134)
 Xenia of Rome (5th-century), January 24, Roman saint
 Xenia of Saint Petersburg (c. 1720–1803), January 24, Russian saint